William Alexander Thomson (November 1, 1816 – October 1, 1878) was a Canadian author, railway promoter and political figure. He represented Welland in the House of Commons of Canada from 1872 to 1878 as a Liberal member.

He was born in Wigtownshire, Scotland and educated there. He emigrated to New York state before moving to Queenston, Upper Canada in 1834. He helped establish the Erie and Niagara Railway, later serving as its president. Thomson was an unsuccessful candidate for the Niagara federal seat, losing to Angus Morrison. He was elected in Welland in an 1872 by-election held after the death of Thomas Clark Street; he did not run in 1878 because of poor health and died later that year near Queenston.

Thomson published an economic treatise, An essay on production, money, and government; in which the principle of a natural law is advanced and explained, whereby credit, debt, taxation, tariffs, and interest on money will be abolished; and national debt and the current expenses of government will be paid in gold, in 1863.

External links 
Biography at the Dictionary of Canadian Biography Online
 

1816 births
1878 deaths
Liberal Party of Canada MPs
Members of the House of Commons of Canada from Ontario
Scottish emigrants to Canada
People from Niagara-on-the-Lake